The Chery Arrizo 7 (艾瑞泽7) is a compact sedan produced by Chery.

Overview
The Arrizo 7 was previewed by the Chery Alpha 7 concept that debuted on the 2013 Shanghai Auto Show. The production version was launched on the Chinese auto market in late 2013 with prices ranging from 78,900 to 126,900 yuan.

Power of the Arrizo 7 comes from two engine options, one being a 1.6 liter engine producing 126hp and 160nm, mated to a 5-speed manual gearbox or a CVT. The later added 1.5 liter turbo engine option produces 147hp and 220nm, and is mated to the same 5-speed manual gearbox or a CVT.

Arrizo 7e
The Chery Arrizo 7e is the plug-in hybrid electric vehicle (PHEV) variant of the Arrizo 7 sedan. Being launched in the Chinese market in early 2016, the pricing of the Arrizo 7e starts from 179,900 yuan. The battery capacity is 9.3 kWh, producing a range of 50 kilometers on pure electric power and a 5 hours charging time. Fuel consumption is 2.2 liters per 100 kilometers.

References

External links

Arrizo 7
mid-size cars
Sedans
Cars introduced in 2013
Cars of China